Edmond Mouele (born 18 February 1982) is a Gabonese football defender playing for AS Mangasport. He is the captain of the Gabon national football team.

Career
Mouele played as a right-back for Gabon at the 2012 Africa Cup of Nations finals.

References

External links 

1982 births
Living people
Gabonese footballers
Gabon international footballers
Association football defenders
AS Mangasport players
2011 African Nations Championship players
2012 Africa Cup of Nations players
21st-century Gabonese people
Gabon A' international footballers
2016 African Nations Championship players